Balbins is a former commune in the Isère department in the Auvergne-Rhône-Alpes region of south-eastern France. On 1 January 2019, it was merged into the new commune Ornacieux-Balbins.

The inhabitants of the commune are known as Balbinois or Balbinoises.

Geography
Balbins is located some 40 km north-west of Grenoble just west of La Côte-Saint-André. Access to the commune is by the D73 from La Côte-Saint-André which passes through the commune just south of the village and continues west to Penol. The D518A passes through the east of the commune linking the D71 south of La Côte-Saint-André to the D518 north-west of La Côte-Saint-André. The commune is almost entirely farmland with urban area of the village merging with that of Ornacieux.

Neighbouring communes and villages

Administration

List of Successive Mayors

Demography
In 2012 the commune had 394 inhabitants.

Sites and monuments

The Buissonnière Tower is the last vestige of the fortified house that stood there; it was the possession of Miribel, Salignon, and Côte Saint-André.
The Chateau of Armanet was a former Templar fortified house

Notable people linked to the communeFélicien de Mons de Savasse''', born in the Chateau of Armanet, Knight and Commander of the Order of Malta in 1760.

See also
Communes of the Isère department

References

External links
Balbins official website 
St Balbin on the 1750 Cassini Map

Former communes of Isère